Platymantis spelaeus, also known as the Negros cave frog or cave wrinkled ground frog, is a species of frog in the family Ceratobatrachidae. It is endemic to the Philippines, where it is only found in the forested limestone areas of southern Negros. It is one of the two cave-dwelling Platymantis species, the other one being Platymantis insulatus.

Description
Adult males measure  and adult females  in snout–vent length. The snout is broadly rounded. The tympanum is relatively large. The fingers and toes bear discs. The fingers are slender and have no webbing, whereas the toes are slightly webbed at base. Dorsal skin is rough (shagreened). The dorsum is olive-green to brown with darker mottling. The upper surfaces of the thighs have dark bars; the inner surfaces are orange or
lavender. The venter is cream and may have brown flecks.

Habitat and conservation
They can be very common and abundant during the rainy season, but are rarely encountered during the dry season. Development is direct (i.e., there is no free-living larval stage).

This species is threatened by habitat loss caused by shifting agriculture, human encroachment, guano mining, and the quarrying of limestone. The type locality is inside the Tiyabanan Banio community-based conservation area.

References

spelaeus
Amphibians of the Philippines
Endemic fauna of the Philippines
Fauna of Negros Island
Amphibians described in 1982
Taxonomy articles created by Polbot